Nico Ihle (born 2 December 1985 in Karl-Marx-Stadt) (since 1990 renamed Chemnitz) is a German speed skater. He competed at the 2014 Winter Olympics in Sochi, in the 500 meters and 1000 meters events and also at the 2018 Winter Olympics in Pyeongchang, South Korea.

Speed skating

Personal records

German national records held by Ihle

Tournament overview

source GWC:

source German data:

World Cup overview

 – = Did not participate
 (b) = Division B
 DQ = Disqualified
 DNF = Did not finish
 GWC = Grand World Cup

References

External links

 Nico Ihle at SpeedSkatingStats.com
 
 
 

1985 births
Living people
German male speed skaters
Olympic speed skaters of Germany
Speed skaters at the 2010 Winter Olympics
Speed skaters at the 2014 Winter Olympics
Speed skaters at the 2018 Winter Olympics
Sportspeople from Chemnitz
21st-century German people